Mount Mumford is the central summit in the line of low rock peaks 4 nautical miles (7 km) north of the west end of Rathbone Hills, in the Gutenko Mountains of central Palmer Land. Mapped by United States Geological Survey (USGS) in 1974. Named by Advisory Committee on Antarctic Names (US-ACAN) for Lieutenant Joel H. Mumford, U.S. Navy, Medical Officer at Palmer Station, 1972.

References

External links

Mountains of Palmer Land